Lilyhammer is a Norwegian–American television series, starring Steven Van Zandt, about a New York gangster trying to start a new life in far away Lillehammer in Norway.

As of 17 December 2014, 24 episodes of Lilyhammer have aired, concluding the third season.

Series overview 

{| class="wikitable" style="text-align: center;"
|-
! style="padding: 0 8px;" colspan="2" rowspan="2"| Season
! style="padding: 0 8px;" rowspan="2"| Episodes
! colspan="2"| Originally aired
|-
! style="padding: 0 8px;"| First aired
! style="padding: 0 8px;"| Last aired
|-
 |style="background: #1356A9;"|
 | 1
 | 8
 | 25 January 2012
 | 14 March 2012
|-
 |style="background: #960018"|
 | 2
 | 8
 | 23 October 2013
 | 11 December 2013
|-
|-
 |style="background: #2F4F4F"|
 | 3
 | 8
 | 29 October 2014
 | 17 December 2014
|-
|}

Episodes

Season 1 (2012)

Season 2 (2013)

Season 3 (2014)
In an interview with Rolling Stone magazine, Van Zandt announced he had signed on for a third season of the show. Filming began 3 January 2014, and the season premiered 21 November 2014. Petter Wallace, external manager for NRK, confirmed that the popular American singer Bruce Springsteen would appear on the show in its third season. Along with being executive producer, writer, actor, and composer on the series, Van Zandt made his directorial debut with the season three finale. Additionally, Angelina Jordan, the 8-year-old winner of Norway's Got Talent, appeared in the final episode as a lounge singer. The third season premiered Friday, 21 November 2014, on Netflix.

References

External links

Lilyhammer episodes
Lilyhammer
Lilyhammer